Lorenzo Rossetti (born 1 July 1980 in Melzo) is an Italian footballer who currently plays as a midfielder for Ravenna.

Football career
Rossetti started his career at A.C. Milan. After graduating from the youth team, he was loaned to Serie C1 clubs. In summer 2003, he was signed by Genoa in co-ownership deal, but he was loaned to Como immediately.

In the next season, he was bought by Cesena. He then played for Triestina and Ravenna since January 2008.

He signed a contract with Ravenna until 2010.

External links
 Gazzetta.it
http://aic.football.it/scheda/3716/rossetti-lorenzo.htm

1980 births
Living people
People from Melzo
Italian footballers
Italy youth international footballers
Serie B players
A.C. Milan players
Calcio Padova players
Como 1907 players
A.C. Cesena players
U.S. Triestina Calcio 1918 players
Ravenna F.C. players
Association football midfielders
Footballers from Lombardy
Sportspeople from the Metropolitan City of Milan